Yellow Creek is a  tributary of the Raystown Branch Juniata River in Bedford County, Pennsylvania, in the United States.

Yellow Creek flows from Morrisons Cove through Loysburg Gap, a water gap in Tussey Mountain, before joining the Raystown Branch at Hopewell.

Bridges
 The Halls Mill Covered Bridge crosses Yellow Creek in Hopewell.

See also
List of rivers of Pennsylvania

References

Rivers of Pennsylvania
Tributaries of the Juniata River
Rivers of Bedford County, Pennsylvania